Aaron Ciammaglichella (born 26 January 2005) is an Italian professional footballer who plays as a midfielder for the Torino U19s.

Professional career
Ciammaglichella moved to the youth academy of Torino in 2015, and worked his way up their youth categories. In September 2022, he was named by English newspaper The Guardian as one of the best players born in 2005 worldwide.

International career
Ciammaglichella was born in Italy to an Ethiopian father and Italian mother. He is a youth internatinoal for Italy, having played for the Italy U15s and U17s.

Playing style
Ciammaglichella is a central midfielder that can play in a 2-man or 3-man defense. He can act as a box-to-box or creative midfielder, or as a false-9. He is strong technically and has great vision, and a very strong presser. He is also a prolific goalscorer and assister.

References

External links
 
 Lega Serie A Profile
 FIGC U15 profile
 FIGC U17 profile

2005 births
Living people
Footballers from Turin
Italian footballers
Italy youth international footballers
Italian people of Ethiopian descent
Association football midfielders
Torino F.C. players